Ultraviolet–visible spectroscopy (UV–vis) can distinguish between enantiomers by showing a distinct Cotton effect for each isomer.  UV–vis spectroscopy sees only chromophores, so other molecules must be prepared for analysis by chemical addition of a chromophore such as anthracene.  Two methods are reported: the octant rule and the exciton chirality method.

The octant rule was introduced in 1961 by  William Moffitt, R. B. Woodward, A. Moscowitz, William Klyne and Carl Djerassi. This empirical rule allows the prediction of the sign of the Cotton effect by analysing relative orientation of substituents in three dimensions and in this way the absolute configuration of an enantiomer.

See also
NMR spectroscopy of stereoisomers

References

Spectroscopy